Cathcart is a census-designated place (CDP) in Snohomish County, Washington, United States. The population was 2,458 at the 2010 census.  Based on per capita income, one of the more reliable measures of affluence, Cathcart ranks 45th of 522 areas in the state of Washington to be ranked.  Cathcart was named for Isaac Cathcart, a lumberman, entrepreneur, and Snohomish County pioneer.

Geography
Cathcart is located at  (47.852603, -122.105802). It is located between Snohomish and Woodinville.

According to the United States Census Bureau, the CDP has a total area of 3.9 square miles (10.0 km2), all of it land.

Demographics
As of the census of 2000, there were 3,015 people, 1,016 households, and 815 families residing in the CDP. The population density was 724.6 people per square mile (279.8/km2). There were 1,042 housing units at an average density of 250.4/sq mi (96.7/km2). The racial makeup of the CDP was 94.16% White, 0.46% African American, 0.46% Native American, 0.80% Asian, 0.23% Pacific Islander, 1.39% from other races, and 2.49% from two or more races. Hispanic or Latino of any race were 2.82% of the population.

There were 1,016 households, out of which 43.2% had children under the age of 18 living with them, 70.1% were married couples living together, 6.1% had a female householder with no husband present, and 19.7% were non-families. 14.5% of all households were made up of individuals, and 3.0% had someone living alone who was 65 years of age or older. The average household size was 2.96 and the average family size was 3.27.

In the CDP, the age distribution of the population shows 30.2% under the age of 18, 6.5% from 18 to 24, 32.6% from 25 to 44, 24.1% from 45 to 64, and 6.5% who were 65 years of age or older. The median age was 37 years. For every 100 females, there were 102.9 males. For every 100 females age 18 and over, there were 99.7 males.

The median income for a household in the CDP was $65,357, and the median income for a family was $77,552. Males had a median income of $52,425 versus $32,417 for females. The per capita income for the CDP was $28,716. About 1.9% of families and 3.9% of the population were below the poverty line, including 1.1% of those under age 18 and 5.3% of those age 65 or over.

References

Census-designated places in Snohomish County, Washington
Census-designated places in Washington (state)